Mohammad Sanuth (born 25 July 1989) is an Indian-born cricketer who plays for the Oman cricket team.

Career
He made his first-class debut on 16 November 2008, for Kerala in the 2008–09 Ranji Trophy. He last played for Kerala in 2011. In November 2019, he was named in Oman's squad for the 2019 ACC Emerging Teams Asia Cup in Bangladesh. The following month, he was named in Oman's One Day International (ODI) squad for the 2020 Oman Tri-Nation Series. He made his ODI debut for Oman, against the United Arab Emirates, on 5 January 2020.

In February 2020, he was named in the Oman's Twenty20 International (T20I) squad for the 2020 ACC Western Region T20 qualifier tournament. He made his T20I debut for Oman, against Bahrain, on 23 February 2020.

References

External links
 

1989 births
Living people
Indian cricketers
Omani cricketers
Oman One Day International cricketers
Oman Twenty20 International cricketers
Kerala cricketers
Indian emigrants to Oman
Indian expatriates in Oman
Cricketers from Thiruvananthapuram